Borotino is a village in the Municipality of Krivogaštani in North Macedonia.

Demographics
Borotino is attested in the Ottoman defter of 1467/68 as a village in the vilayet of Manastir. The inhabitants attested primarily bore Christian Slavic anthroponyms, although with one instance of the Albanian personal name Gjergj: Bojo son of Gjergj.

According to the 2002 census, the village had a total of 277 inhabitants. Ethnic groups in the village include:

Macedonians 277

References

Villages in Krivogaštani Municipality